The Hungary national youth handball team is the national under-18 handball team of Hungary. Controlled by the Hungarian Handball Federation, that is an affiliate of the International Handball Federation IHF as well as a member of the European Handball Federation EHF,The team represents Hungary in international matches.

Statistics

Youth Olympic Games 

 Champions   Runners up   Third place   Fourth place

World Championship record
 Champions   Runners up   Third place   Fourth place

EHF European Youth Championship 
 Champions   Runners up   Third place   Fourth place

References

External links
World Men's Youth Championship table
European Men's Youth Championship table

Handball in Hungary
Men's national youth handball teams
Handball